Odysseas Football Club is a Greek football club, based in Anagennisi, Serres Prefecture, Macedonia.

The association was founded in 1952. In 2009, they played in Gamma Ethniki and after three years the team didn't exist.

1952 establishments in Greece
Serres (regional unit)
Football clubs in Central Macedonia
Association football clubs established in 1952
2012 disestablishments in Greece
Association football clubs established in 2012